Frank Newman Speller, Sr (January 1, 1875 – January 12, 1968) was a Canadian born American metallurgical engineer notable for his pioneering text on corrosion in 1926. For his service to the field he won the Longstreth Medal (1927), American Iron and Steel Institute Medal and the Max Hecht Award (1960).

The Frank Newman Speller Award was named in his honor.

Books by Speller
 Frank Newman Speller, Corrosion, Causes and Prevention - an engineering problem, McGraw-Hill Book Company, Inc., New York, 1926, LCCN: 26010656.

References
 Am. Iron Steel Inst. Yearbook, pp. 48–79, 1948
 Am. Iron Steel Inst. Yearbook, p. 48, 1953
 Who's Who in Engineering 1948

External links
 Speller biography

1875 births
1968 deaths
University of Toronto alumni
American engineers
American metallurgists
Canadian emigrants to the United States